Bluebeam, Inc. is an American software company founded in 2002 and headquartered in Pasadena, California, United States, with additional offices in Chicago, Illinois; San Diego, California; and Manchester, New Hampshire.  The company specializes in designing tools for creating, editing, marking up, collaborating and sharing PDF documents. Their main product is Bluebeam Revu.

In October 2014, Bluebeam was acquired by Nemetschek for $100 million and the company's software has more than 1.6 million users.

Products 
Bluebeam Software's products include:
 Bluebeam Revu for PDF creation, markup and editing.
 Bluebeam Vu for PDF viewing on Windows and the iPad.  Vu for the Windows platform includes Bluebeam Studio for online collaboration.
 Bluebeam Vu iPad, a complimentary iPad app for PDF viewing.
 Studio Server is a server-based program for firms that want to use Bluebeam Studio to collaborate and share information in a locally hosted environment.

Previous Products 
 Pushbutton PDF

References 

Software companies established in 2002
Software companies based in California
2002 establishments in California
Defunct software companies of the United States